The Dairymaid of St Kathrein or The Milkmaid of St. Kathrein (German: Die Sennerin von St. Kathrein) is a 1955 Austrian drama film directed by Herbert B. Fredersdorf and starring Anita Gutwell, Rudolf Lenz and Rudolf Carl. It is a heimatfilm, inspired by the success of the earlier The Forester of the Silver Wood which featured the same leading actors. A further film Forest Liesel was made in 1956 by Fredersdorf.

The film's sets were designed by the art director Fritz Jüptner-Jonstorff. It was partly shot in the state of Salzburg.

Cast
   Anita Gutwell  as Liesl, die Sennerin  
 Rudolf Lenz  as Martin  
 Rudolf Carl  as Hiasl 
 Hans Bergen as Wirt  
 Franz Eichberger  as Otto, Jäger  
 Ludwig Geiger as Apotheker  
 Gerhard Hofer as Fischer-Tomerl  
 Anton Karas as Lehrer  
Harry Kratz  as Hansl  
 Lotte Ledl  as Johanna  
 Beppo Louca  as 2.Holzfäller  
 Hans Putz  as Franz  
 Heinz Rohn  as Bürgermeister  
 Albert Rueprecht  as Jager-Loisl  
 Edd Stavjanik as 1. Holzfäller  
 Lola Urban-Kneidinger  as Wirtin  
 Gerti Wiedner  as Vroni

References

Bibliography 
 Fritsche, Maria. Homemade Men in Postwar Austrian Cinema: Nationhood, Genre and Masculinity. Berghahn Books, 2013.

External links 
 

1955 films
1955 drama films
Austrian drama films
1950s German-language films
Films directed by Herbert B. Fredersdorf
Films set in the Alps
Films about hunters